"Whenever I Call You Friend" is a song written by Kenny Loggins and Melissa Manchester, which Loggins recorded for his 1978 album Nightwatch. Issued as a single, "Whenever I Call You 'Friend reached #5 in the autumn of 1978.

"Whenever I Call You 'Friend is a duet with Stevie Nicks, who, though credited on the album track, is not credited on the single, making "Whenever I Call You 'Friend, in effect, Loggins's first major solo hit.

In the Netherlands, the pop charts TV programme TopPop invited Dutch singer Kimm Hekker to stand in as the duet singer next to Loggins, as Nicks didn't come over to perform.

Melissa Manchester would say of her one-off songwriting collaboration with Kenny Loggins: "It came out of the oddity of the times - he and I kept running into each other at televised award shows, which were fairly new...We were frequently paired up to present awards together. We would meet and chat in the Green Room, and finally he asked if we could get together and write something. He came to my house one night and we polished off that song."

Manchester would record her own version of the song for her 1979 self-titled album in a duet version with Arnold McCuller. Charles Donovan of AllMusic said Manchester's version was a "far more supple, elegant song" than the Loggins-Nicks duet. In 2012 Manchester, commenting on the absence of her version of "Whenever I Call You Friend" from her retrospective release Playlist: The Very Best of Melissa Manchester, stated: "The reason that it's not [included] is because I don't feel that I have a satisfactory version of the song...Kenny and I have not been able to schedule time to record it together, though we would both like to. We almost got together but our schedules just would not allow it. But the universe is going to create a better time for us to do that."

Personnel
 Kenny Loggins listed as "Ken Loggins" – lead and backing vocals, guitar
Stevie Nicks – lead and backing vocals
 Mike Hamilton – guitar, backing vocals
 George Hawkins – bass, backing vocals
 Brian Mann – acoustic piano (intro), electric piano
 Tris Imboden – drums
 Jon Clarke – horns, woodwinds
 Vince Denham – horns
 Bob James – string arrangements

Chart performance

Weekly charts

Year-end charts

Cover versions

In 1981 Jeane Manson recorded a French rendering of "Whenever I Call You 'Friend titled "Amitié et amour"; a substantial portion of Loggins's vocal from his 1978 recording was grafted onto the track. Credited to "Jeane Manson & Kenny Loggins," it reached number 54 on the French charts. Later, in 1997 Michael Johnson and Alison Krauss recorded their version for Johnson's album Then and Now, which he co-produced with Gary Paczosa and Krauss's brother Viktor. The album was released by Intersound after its closure and acquisition by Platinum Entertainment.

References

External links
 

1978 songs
1978 singles
Kenny Loggins songs
Stevie Nicks songs
Columbia Records singles
Songs written by Kenny Loggins
Songs written by Melissa Manchester
Male–female vocal duets
Alison Krauss songs
Melissa Manchester songs
Michael Johnson (singer) songs
Songs about friendship